Aboubakar Pedro Gakou (born 27 May 1997) is an Angolan basketball player who plays for Petro de Luanda and .

Professional career
Gakou started playing basketball only at age 17. A year later, in 2015, he was a prospect on the roster of Petro de Luanda. He won his first Angolan championship in 2019. Gakou was named the league's Most Valuable Player of the 2020–21 season after winning his second championship with the team. He was forced to miss the 2021 BAL season after he tested positive for COVID-19, making it impossible for him to join the bubble.

In the 2021–22 season, Gakou helped Petro win the national treble. He also helped his team reach the 2022 BAL Finals, where the team lost to US Monastir. On May 27, Gakou was named to the BAL All-Defensive Team.

National team career
Internationally, Gakou has played for the Angola national basketball team. He was on the roster for AfroBasket 2021.

Awards and accomplishments

Club
Petro de Luanda
3× Angolan Basketball League: (2019, 2021, 2022)
Taça de Angola: (2022)
 Supertaça de Angola: (2021)

Individual
BAL All-Defensive Team: (2022)
Angolan League MVP: (2021)

References

External links
Afrobasket profile

1997 births
Living people
Power forwards (basketball)
Atlético Petróleos de Luanda basketball players
Angolan men's basketball players